Handkea excipuliformis, commonly known as the pestle puffball or long-stemmed puffball, is a species of the family Agaricaceae. Widespread in northern temperate zones, it is found frequently on pastures and sandy heaths.

Taxonomy
This puffball has been variously placed in the genera Bovista, Lycoperdon, Calvatia, and Utraria. In 1989, German mycologist Hanns Kreisel described the genus Handkea to include species of Calvatia that had distinct microscopic features: Handkea species have a unique type of capillitium (coarse thick-walled hyphae in the gleba), with curvy slits instead of the usual pores. Although accepted by some authors, the genus concept has been rejected by others.

Phylogenetic analyses published in 2008 shows that Handkea may be grouped in a clade along with species from several other genera, including Lycoperdon, Vascellum, Morganella, Bovistella, and Calvatia. Published in the same year, another DNA analysis of the structure of ITS2 rDNA transcript confirmed that H. utriformis is closely related to Lycoperdon echinatum.

Description

Like all puffballs, Handkea excipuliformis has a gasteroid basidiocarp, meaning the spores are produced internally, and are only released as the mature fruiting body ages and dries, or is broken. The underside of the puffball is attached to the ground by a root-like assemblage of hyphae called  a rhizomorph. This fungus comprises two parts. The upper, globe-like section, which is white at first and turns ochre as it ages, is initially covered in soft, pointed warts; these fall off to leave a smooth, matt surface. Inside this rounded head the spores develop. The brown spores are released into the air; this process is often hastened by rain, or by being trodden on by cattle. Eventually, all that remains is the sterile pestle-shaped base.

The stipe expands once the head has ruptured and released the spores and then remain intact throughout the winter and into the following summer. It is parallel or slightly tapering in at the base; spongy; surface soon becoming wrinkled; initially white with pointed warts, but later turning ochre and becoming smooth and leathery.

Spores
Initially the spore mass (gleba) is white, later becoming olive and then purple-brown at maturity. Spores are 3.5 to 5.5 micrometres, warted and ball shaped.

Distribution and habitat
Common and widespread from late summer until autumn. The pestle puffball Grows singly or in small groups in humus soil in both coniferous and broadleaf woodland and on short grassland. Frequent beneath hedges, on wasteland and in all kinds of woods; particularly common on the edges of woodland clearings.

Edibility

This fairly large puffball is edible only when the spore bearing flesh is young, and white. The taste and odour are not  distinctive. Edible only when young and white throughout. It tastes very similar to the giant puffball, but the flesh is not quite as firm and the outer skin should be removed.

Similar species
Handkea perlatum is much smaller, has a shorter stipe, and retains a mesh-like pattern when the warts are rubbed off the cap.

References

External links

Agaricaceae
Edible fungi
Fungi of Europe
Fungi of North America
Puffballs